The 2014 TCU Horned Frogs football team represented Texas Christian University (TCU) in the 2014 NCAA Division I FBS football season. Playing as a member of the Big 12 Conference (Big 12), the team was led by head coach Gary Patterson, in his 14th year, and played its home games at Amon G. Carter Stadium in Fort Worth, Texas. They finished the season 12–1, 8–1 in Big 12 play to finish as co-champions. They were invited to the Peach Bowl where they defeated Ole Miss.

Coaching staff

Schedule 

Schedule Source:

Game summaries

Samford

Minnesota

@ SMU

Oklahoma

@ Baylor

Oklahoma State

Texas Tech

@ West Virginia

Kansas State

@ Kansas

@ Texas

Iowa State

Ole Miss –Peach Bowl

Rankings

References

TCU
TCU Horned Frogs football seasons
Big 12 Conference football champion seasons
Peach Bowl champion seasons
TCU Horned Frogs football